The Registered Organisations Commission (ROC) was an independent, statutory authority of the Australian Government, responsible for the regulation and education of registered organisations (that is, trade unions and employer organisations) in Australia. The ROC was established under the Fair Work (Registered Organisations) Amendment Act 2016 (Cth).

The role of the ROC includes the following functions:
 assessing the financial reports, annual returns, and disclosure statements by organisations and their branches;
 arranging elections for organisations and their branches;
 approving governance and compliance training;
 providing education, assistance and advice to organisations; and
 conducting inquiries and investigations into breaches of registered organisation legislation.

The legislation establishing the ROC (originally put into the Australian Parliament as the Fair Work Amendment (Registered Organisations) Bill 2014) was one of the double dissolution triggers for the 2016 federal election under section 57 of the Australian Constitution. Following the election, the Turnbull Government was successful in passing the legislation establishing the ROC with the vote of Senators Pauline Hanson, Nick Xenophon and Derryn Hinch.

It was political controversial, with the major left wing parties, the Australian Labor Party and the Australian Greens both opposing the organisation on the grounds of it being a political motivated union busting organisation. When Anthony Albanese won the election with Labor they abolished the ROC and it was closed in early 2023.

The Registered Organisations Commissioner, in office since the establishment of the ROC in May 2017 was Mr Mark Bielecki, a former South Australian Regional Commissioner at the Australian Securities and Investments Commission.

References

External links
 Website

Commonwealth Government agencies of Australia
2017 establishments in Australia
Regulatory authorities of Australia
Australian labour law